Caparrapí is a municipality and town of Colombia in the department of Cundinamarca.

References

External links 

Municipalities of Cundinamarca Department